Nem Moccu Birn  (or Nennus, Nenus, Nehemias; died 14 June 654) was Abbot of Aran.
His feast day is 14 June.

Biography 
Nem was one of the few known successors of Enda of Aran, and appears to be the first such abbot listed in the Irish annals after Enda himself.

The word moccu is actually a contracted form of "mac Ua Birn", indicating that St. Nem was a descendant of Loegaire Birn Buadach, and early king of Ossory and thus a scion of the Dál Birn lineage of Ossory.  In the Félire Óengusso, he is recorded as being a relation of St. Ciarán of Saigir.

Annalistic references 

From the Annals of the Four Masters:

 M654.2. St Nem Mac Ua Birn, successor of Enne, of Ara, died on the 14th of June.

From the Félire Óengusso ("The Martyrology of Óengus"):

 "14. Nem, i.e. a pope who is in Aran, and he is a successor of Enda of Aran, and of the Dál Birn of Ossory he is, and a brother of Ciarán of Saiger.

Nem great-grandson of Bern. He was called by three names, to wit, Nem and Pupu and Cáilbe. Nem primum nomen etc. Whence Senan of Inis Cathaig sang Abbas almus amabilis etc.

A successor of Peter and Paul, Cailbe came from the east from Rome, Nem, great-grandson of Bern, a bright brother, whose name is Pupu of Aran."

Monks of Ramsgate account

The monks of St Augustine's Abbey, Ramsgate wrote in their Book of Saints (1921),

Butler's account

The hagiographer Alban Butler (1710–1773) wrote in his Lives of the Fathers, Martyrs, and Other Principal Saints under June 14,

See also 

 Inishmore

Notes

Sources

External links 
 http://www.ucc.ie/celt/online/T100005A.html
Catholic Encyclopedia 1908: "The Monastic School of Aran"
Rev. Clifford Stevens, The One Year Book of Saints "St. Enda"

7th-century deaths
7th-century Christian saints
Christian clergy from County Galway
Medieval Irish saints
7th-century Irish abbots
Year of birth unknown